Drasteria nephelostola is a moth of the family Erebidae. It is found in India (Jammu and Kashmir).

References

Drasteria
Moths described in 1926
Moths of Asia